Angamaly-West is a diocese of the Oriental Orthodox Church in India. The present Diocean head is Bishop Yuhanon Mar Policarpus, who took charge in February 2009. The Malankara Church  officially known as Malankara Orthodox Syrian Church which formed in AD 52 by St Thomas the apostle. It has established many dioceses in India and abroad. Angamal-West diocese has only a few churches and these have small congregations. The largest church is Kunnakkurudy St. George Cathedral. 

Churches that form Angamaly-West Diocese of Malankara Orthodox Syrian Church, which have been obtained mainly after court orders  -

Aluva College Hill St. Thomas Church
 Ankamaly Mar Gregorios Church
Chathamattom Carmel St. Peter's & St. Paul's Church
Eloor Mar Gregorios Church
Kodanadu Sehion Church
Kunnakurudy St. George Cathedral
Pothanikadu Umminikunnu St. Mary's Maha Edavka Church

Malankara Orthodox Syrian Church dioceses
Year of establishment missing